Viktor Aleksandrovich Nozdrin (born November 6, 1951) is a Russian professional football coach and a former player. In 2009, he managed FC Sakhalin Yuzhno-Sakhalinsk.

External links
  Career summary at KLISF

1951 births
Living people
Soviet footballers
FC Lokomotiv Moscow players
FC Spartak Moscow players
PFC Spartak Nalchik players
Russian football managers
FC Metallurg Lipetsk players
Association football midfielders
FC Spartak Kostroma players